M. fulgida may refer to:

 Meda fulgida, a ray-finned fish
 Tetracha fulgida, a tiger beetle, formerly in the genus Megacephala
 Melecta fulgida, an Israeli bee
 Milionia fulgida, a geometer moth
 Miresa fulgida, a slug moth
 Mnesarete fulgida, a broad-winged damselfly
 Myrmecia fulgida, an Australian ant